The 2021 New Jersey State Senate election was held on November 2, 2021. New Jersey voters elected state senators in all of the state's legislative districts for a two-year term to the New Jersey Senate. This was the first election since 1991 where Republicans net gained state Senate seats.

Incumbents not running for re-election

Democratic
Loretta Weinberg, District 37

Republican
Kip Bateman, District 16
Thomas Kean Jr., District 21 (running for NJ-07 in 2022)

In addition, five members who were elected in the last election in 2017 have since left office: Robert M. Gordon (D-38th, resigned), Jeff Van Drew (D-1st, resigned), Anthony R. Bucco (R-25th, died in office), Gerald Cardinale (R-39th, died in office), and Chris A. Brown, (R-2nd, resigned after previously announcing retirement).

Results

Overview

By State Senate District

Close races 
Seats where the margin of victory was under 10%:
  gain
  gain
 
 
 
  gain

District 1

Republican primary

Democratic primary

General election
Polling

Predictions

Results

District 2

Republican primary
Polling

Democratic primary

General election
Polling

Predictions

Results

District 3

Democratic primary

Republican primary

General election
Predictions

Results

District 4

Democratic primary

Republican primary

General election
Predictions

Results

District 5

Democratic primary

Republican primary
No Republicans filed. However, Clyde Cook received enough write-in votes to qualify for the general election.

General election
Predictions

Results

District 6

Democratic primary

Republican primary

General election
Predictions

Results

District 7

Democratic primary

Republican primary

General election
Predictions

Results

District 8

Democratic primary

Republican primary

General election
Predictions

Results

District 9

Republican primary

Democratic primary

General election
Predictions

Results

District 10

Republican primary

Democratic primary

General election
Predictions

Results

District 11

Democratic primary

Endorsements

Republican primary

General election
Predictions

Results

Endorsements

District 12

Republican primary

Democratic primary

General election
Predictions

Results

District 13

Republican primary

Democratic primary

General election
Predictions

Results

District 14

Democratic primary

Endorsements

Republican primary

General election
Predictions

Results

Endorsements

District 15

Democratic primary

Endorsements

Republican primary

General election
Predictions

Results

Endorsements

District 16

Republican primary

Democratic primary

Endorsements

General election
Polling

Predictions

Results

Endorsements

District 17

Democratic primary

Endorsements

Republican primary

General election
Predictions

Results

Endorsements

District 18

Democratic primary

Endorsements

Republican primary

General election
Predictions

Results

Endorsements

District 19

Democratic primary

Republican primary

Following the primary, Onuoha was replaced on the ballot for the general election by Pedro "Peter" Pisar on August 23.

General election
Predictions

Results

District 20

Democratic primary

Candidates 
 Joseph Cryan, incumbent State Senator since 2018
 Jamel Holley, State Assemblyman from Roselle since 2015
Withdrew
 Jason Krychiw, suspended campaign on April 23, 2021

Results

Endorsements

Republican primary
No Republicans filed.

General election
Predictions

Results

Endorsements

District 21

Republican primary

Democratic primary

General election
Predictions

Results

District 22

Democratic primary

Republican primary

General election
Predictions

Results

District 23

Republican primary

Democratic primary

General election
Predictions

Results

District 24

Republican primary

Candidates
 Daniel Cruz, member of the Andover Township Board of Education
 Steve Oroho, incumbent Senator since 2008

Results

Democratic primary
No Democrats filed. However, Frederick P. Cook received enough write-in votes to qualify for the general election.

General election
Predictions

Results

District 25

Republican primary

Democratic primary

General election
Predictions

Results

District 26

Republican primary

Democratic primary

General election
Predictions

Results

District 27

Democratic primary

Endorsements

Republican primary

General election
Predictions

Results

Endorsements

District 28

Democratic primary

Republican primary

General election
Predictions

Results

District 29

Democratic primary

Republican primary
No Republicans filed.

General election
Predictions

Results

District 30

Republican primary

Democratic primary

General election
Predictions

Results

District 31

Democratic primary

Republican primary

General election
Predictions

Results

District 32

Democratic primary

Candidates 
 Nicholas Sacco, incumbent Senator since 1994 and Mayor of North Bergen

Results

Republican primary

General election
Predictions

Results

District 33

Democratic primary

Republican primary

General election
Predictions

Results

District 34

Democratic primary

Republican primary

General election
Predictions

Results

District 35

Democratic primary

Republican primary

General election
Predictions

Results

District 36

Democratic primary

Republican primary
No Republicans filed. However, Chris Auriemma received enough write-in votes to qualify for the general election.

General election
Predictions

Results

District 37

Democratic primary

Endorsements

Republican primary

General election
Predictions

Results

Endorsements

District 38

Democratic primary

Candidates
 Joseph Lagana, incumbent Senator since 2018

Results

Republican primary

General election
Predictions

Results

District 39

Republican primary

Candidates 
 Holly Schepisi, incumbent Senator since 2021

Results

Democratic primary

General election
Predictions

Results

District 40

Republican primary

Democratic primary

General election
Predictions

Results

Notes

References

2021
New Jersey State Senate
state senate